Thybo is a Danish surname. Notable people with this surname include:

 Hans Thybo (born 1954), Danish geoscientist
 Jesper Søndergaard Thybo (born 1999), Danish chess grand master
 Kurt Thybo or Kurt Thyboe (born 1940), Danish author, journalist, sports commentator and performer
 Leif Thybo (1922–2001), Danish organist and composer

Danish-language surnames